Kujawa is a Polish surname. Notable people with the surname include:

 Dawid Kujawa (born 1981), Polish speedway rider
 Jens Kujawa (born 1965), German basketball player
 Rafał Kujawa (born 1988), Polish footballer
 Robert Kujawa (1925–2008), American musician known by his stage name as Bob Kames
 Serge Kujawa (1924–2014), Canadian politician and lawyer
 Sharon Kujawa, American audiologist

See also
 

Polish-language surnames